Stephen David Hindmarch (born 16 November 1989) is an English footballer who plays as an attacking midfielder or striker.

Early life
Hindmarch was born in Penrith, Cumbria and grew up in the Lake District town of Keswick. When Hindmarch grew up he was a keen footballer and cricket player, and his main strength in cricket was his batting.

Footballing career

Carlisle United

Youth
Hindmarch, aged 14, playing in Carlisle United's Under-14-year old team, was attracting the interest of Premiership, but he decided to stay with his local professional club, signing YTS forms. After signing for the club, Hindmarch played both for the youth and reserve teams at the Brunton Park club.

First team
On 3 September 2006 Hindmarch, aged 16 years and 291 days old and a first year YTS player was on the substitutes bench for the game against Cheltenham Town (he was given the squad number 28) after Michael Bridges moved on to Hull City and scoring against Bury's reserve team on 30 August 2006 the game finished 3–3,. this was only Hindmarch's fourth reserve match,. United manager Neil McDonald who was at the game was impressed with the goal. He made his début for the 1st team on 9 September 2006, aged 16 years and 297 days, coming on as an 86th minute substitute replacing Simon Hackney in the process during the 1–1 draw against Northampton Town. He would go on to appear 10 times for Carlisle during the 2006–07 all as substitute, failing to score any goals. During the 2007–08 season Hindmarch failed to regain a first team place and he was released in May 2008.

Shrewsbury Town
However, in May 2008, Hindmarch was signed by former Carlisle United manager Paul Simpson for League Two Shrewsbury Town, alongside former teammate Paul Murray. He was among 8 players released after the play-off defeat to Gillingham at Wembley.

On 5 June 2009 Hindmarch joined Workington in the Conference North ahead of the new season. In 2014, he went abroad to Canada to sign with Kingston of the Canadian Soccer League.

Career statistics

Cricket career 
Stephen represented the North of England Cricket team at U15 level. He currently plays for his home team Keswick Cricket Club.

Family
Stephen's brother, Paul, is a young cricketer at Durham CCC's academy.
In winter 2008 Paul played in Australia for Wanneroo.

References

External links

Official Carlisle United Profile
Keswick Cricket Club Website

1989 births
Living people
People from Keswick, Cumbria
People from Penrith, Cumbria
English footballers
Association football forwards
Carlisle United F.C. players
Shrewsbury Town F.C. players
Workington A.F.C. players
Kingston FC players
English Football League players
Canadian Soccer League (1998–present) players
English expatriate sportspeople in Canada
Expatriate soccer players in Canada
English expatriate footballers
Hawke's Bay United FC players
New Zealand Football Championship players
Footballers from Cumbria